The 2003 Clemson Tigers football team represented Clemson University during the 2003 NCAA Division I-A football season.

Schedule

Roster

References

Clemson
Peach Bowl champion seasons
Clemson Tigers football seasons
Clemson Tigers football